Mongolian Princess is a 2015 South Korean romantic drama film directed, written by, and starring Danwoo Jung, along with Elisabeth Garcia and Park Ha-na.

Plot
This series tell about a love story about people who just aren't that interesting, what real-life romance actually the only person to have ever gone through a forced love story.

Dan-Woo (played by Danwoo Jung) is a man in his mid-thirties who's been bumming most of his life around the international acting circuit and career path which is far less interesting than it sounds. He's never even had a serious girlfriend, but that changes when he meets Elisabeth (played by Elisabeth Garcia), a French writer.

Danwoo likes communicating with someone who doesn't make him feel like an idiot, while Elisabeth likes the attention. This is the entire basis of their relationship. However, they later break-up hardly after told Danwoo's flashback, as his current-day relationship with Ha-Na (played by Park Ha-na). Neither Elisabeth nor Ha-Na particularly wants to hurt Dan-woo's feelings, but it's only the latter woman who recognizes that Danwoo's long term needs sometimes necessitate her saying things he doesn't want to hear.

This is a sweet and moving story about people who try to use romance to escape loneliness, only to realize that an absence of loneliness isn't the same thing as happiness. Even a break-up isn't the end of the world, Danwoo did manage to meet Ha-Na after all. Even if this was less because Elisabeth taught him how to love as it was because Danwoo had the sense not to attempt that same mistake again.

Cast

Main
Danwoo Jung as Dan-Woo
Elisabeth Garcia as Elisabeth
Park Ha-na as Ha-Na

Supporting
Lee Eun-sol as Eun-Sol
Kim Sun-young as Ji-No
Lusy Loke as Carol
Lee Ji-eun as a music director
Kang Eun-byul as a theater staff
Lee Tae-kyung as a Film audience
Daniel Kay as Alex
Kinnis Peabe as Chris
Khalid Taphia as Ma-Bin
Michelle Oliver as Cassie
Yoo Nan-hee as Michelle

Cameo
Hong Suk-chun as a Film actor
Kim Jong-soo as a Film actor
Park Hye-jin as Ha-Na's mother 
Je Yi-jung as an English language teacher

Original Soundtrack

References

External links
몽골리안 프린세스 - 연예초보의 경험미숙 판타지 on Naver .

2010s Korean-language films
South Korean romantic drama films
2015 romantic drama films
2015 films
2010s South Korean films